The chapters of the manga series 07-Ghost are written and illustrated by Yuki Amemiya and Yukino Ichihara. The series focuses on Teito Klein, a former slave sent to attend the Barsburg Empire's military academy due to his ability to use Zaiphon, a type of supernatural power. The ability is rare, and thus highly prized. Teito is an amnesiac and doesn't remember anything of his origins - what he does learn of his past comes from his recurring and often traumatizing dreams.

07-Ghost was serialized in the monthly magazine Monthly Comic Zero Sum, published by Ichijinsha. Seventeen tankoban volumes have been released. The first volume released on November 25, 2005, and the final on September 25, 2013. The manga was licensed by Go! Comi for release in North America. Viz Media has since picked up the license for the series, after Go!Comi closed, after only releasing the first 3 volumes of 07-Ghost.

Volume list
Note: Only the first three volumes were released in English by Go!Comi before they closed; both the Go!Comi and Viz Media release dates and ISBNs are listed for volumes 1-3. From volume 4 onwards, the only release dates and ISBNs are that of Viz Media.

References

External links
 

07 Ghost